The year 1726 in architecture involved some significant events.

Buildings and structures

Buildings

 Work begins on the Dresden Frauenkirche, in Dresden, Germany, designed by George Bähr (completed in 1743; destroyed in 1945; reconstructed in 2005).
 Completion of St Martin-in-the-Fields Church, London, designed by James Gibbs.

Awards
 Grand Prix de Rome, architecture: François Carlier.

Births
November 15 – Henry Keene, English architect (died 1776)

Deaths
 March 26 – Sir John Vanbrugh (born 1664)
 September 16 – Jakob Prandtauer (born 1660)

References

architecture
Years in architecture
18th-century architecture